Daniel Barrett may refer to:

Music
 Dan Barrett (musician) (born 1955), American jazz trombonist
 Dan Barrett (born 1980), American musician and founding member of Have a Nice Life

Sports
 Daniel Barrett (footballer) (born 1980), English footballer for Chesterfield
 Danny Barrett (American football) (born 1961), former Canadian Football League quarterback
 Danny Barrett (rugby union) (born 1990), American rugby player
 Dan Barrett (coach), soccer coach

Other
 Dan Barrett (politician), American attorney & judicial candidate from North Carolina
 Daniel J. Barrett (born 1963), American writer and software engineer
 Daniel Barrett (visual effects supervisor), Academy Award nomination for Rise of the Planet of the Apes